Girls Club, Girls' club, or variations, may refer to:

 Girls' Club Foundation, a non-profit art foundation and alternative art space, located in downtown Fort Lauderdale
 Girls, Inc., formerly the "Girls Club of America"

Places
 Girls Club (San Francisco, California), listed on the NRHP in California 
 Bristol Girls' Club, Bristol, Connecticut, listed on the NRHP in Hartford County, Connecticut

Entertainment
 Girl's Club, a fantasy dating game published on a CD
 Girls Club (TV series), a short-lived television series created by David E. Kelley

See also
 Boys & Girls Club (disambiguation)